"No Worries" is a song by English production trio Disciples and French house music producer and disc jockey (DJ) David Guetta. The song was released as a digital download on 15 April 2016. The song has peaked at number 90 on the Australian Singles Chart. The song was written by David Guetta, Nathan Duvall, Gavin Koolman, Luke McDermott, Curtis Richardson, Daniel Amell, Frederic Riesterer, and Ralph Wegner, while vocals are by Curtis Richa.

Track listing

Charts

Release history

References

2016 singles
2016 songs
David Guetta songs
Parlophone singles
Songs written by David Guetta
Song recordings produced by David Guetta